Lunarian may refer to:
 Supposed inhabitants of the Moon in fiction
 A fictional race of the Final Fantasy IV video game
 A fictional race of the anime/manga One Piece
 A fictional race from Touhou Project franchise
 Lunarian (album), a 2021 Donovan album

See also 
 Luna (disambiguation)
 Lunar (disambiguation)
 Lunatic (disambiguation)
 Moon people (disambiguation)